Kenneth Arthur Chapman (25 April 1932 – 2019) was an English professional footballer who played as an inside forward.

Career
Born in Coventry, Chapman played for Warwick Town, Coventry City, Blackpool, Crewe Alexandra, Bradford City and Banbury Spencer.

He joined Bradford City in July 1954, making 26 league appearances (scoring 4 goals) and 2 FA Cup appearances (scoring 2 goals) for the club, before moving to Banbury Spencer in July 1955.

Chapman died in 2019.

Sources

References

1932 births
2019 deaths
English footballers
Coventry City F.C. players
Blackpool F.C. players
Crewe Alexandra F.C. players
Bradford City A.F.C. players
Banbury United F.C. players
English Football League players
Footballers from Coventry
Association football inside forwards